The following is a list of football stadiums in Chile, ordered by capacity.

See also
List of South American stadiums by capacity
List of association football stadiums by capacity

Football venues in Chile
Chile
Football stadiums
Stadiums